"It Takes a Fool to Remain Sane" is a song performed by the Ark on their 2000 studio album We Are the Ark. It was a hit in Sweden and Italy. The song was also awarded a Grammis for "song of the year".

Track listing
 "It Takes a Fool to Remain Sane" – 3:56
 "The Homecomer" – 5:28

Charts

Omar Rudberg cover 
Omar Rudberg sang a cover version for the Netflix show Young Royals. He also released it as a single in 2021.

References

2000 songs
The Ark (Swedish band) songs
Songs written by Ola Salo